Aeolochroma olivia is a moth of the family Geometridae first described by Gilbert M. Goldfinch in 1943. It is found in New South Wales, Australia.

The specific epithet olivia was given in honour of the wife of Gilbert M. Goldfinch, who described the species.

References

Moths described in 1943
Pseudoterpnini
Moths of Australia